Dorcadiini is a tribe of longhorn beetles of the subfamily Lamiinae. It was described by Pierre André Latreille in 1825.

Taxonomy
 Corestheta Pascoe, 1875
 Dorcadion Dalman, 1817
 Elasmotena McKeown, 1945
 Eodorcadion Breuning, 1946
 Microlamia Bates, 1874
 Neodorcadion Ganglbauer, 1883
 Paraxylotoles Breuning, 1973
 Parmenomorpha Blackburn, 1889
 Trichodorcadion Breuning, 1942
 Xylotoles Newman, 1840

References

 
Lamiinae